Peel County may refer to:

 Peel County, Ontario, Canada
 Peel County, Western Australia